José Alberto Medrano (2 November 1917 – 23 March 1985) was a Salvadoran general who, starting in the 1960s, headed the National Security Agency of El Salvador (ANSESAL) and the Nationalist Democratic Organization (ORDEN), a paramilitary group supported by the Green Berets. ORDEN was later accused by Amnesty International of using "clandestine terror against government opponents." He was also leader at some point, of the national guard of El Salvador.

References

External links
History Commons "Profile: Jose Alberto “Chele” Medrano." Accessed 25 November 2008.

People of the Salvadoran Civil War
Salvadoran military personnel
1917 births
1985 deaths